William Dalling, DCL was an English priest and academic in the 15th century.

Dalling was Master of Trinity Hall, Cambridge from 1471 to 1501. He held livings at Huntingdon and Over.

References

Masters of Trinity Hall, Cambridge
15th-century English Roman Catholic priests
16th-century English Roman Catholic priests